Bernard Lapasset  (born 20 October 1947) is a French rugby administrator who was Chairman of the World Rugby from 2008 to 2016. He previously served as President of the French Federation of Rugby Union from 1991 to May 2008, when Pierre Camou, then vice-president took over. He is also vice-chairman of the National Olympic Committee.

Lapasset was born in Tarbes, Hautes-Pyrénées.

He played a critical role in France winning the hosting rights to the 2007 Rugby World Cup and its organisation and the introduction of rugby sevens into the Olympics for 2016.

Biography
He is married and has three children. Law degree and office, he was Director of Customs (General Directorate of Customs and Excise.) before embarking on a career in rugby administration.

As a player of rugby, he is junior champion of France Agen Reichel with the U.S. in 1967 and Champion of France with the U.S. Customs Corporate Paris.
As leader, he is chairman of the regional rugby in Ile-de-France from 1988 to 1992, then secretary general of the French Rugby Federation in 1991.

In 2003, he helped obtain for France, the organization of the World Cup Rugby 2007. Since 2004, he was president of ILM 2007 World Cup.

On 19 October 2007 he was elected president of the IRB and thus succeeded Syd Millar. He served two terms and was succeeded by Englishman Bill Beaumont on 1 July 2016.

Lapasset is an Officer of the Legion of Honour and co-chairman of France Friendship Fund New Zealand. In the 2006 Queen's Birthday Honours, he was appointed an honorary Officer of the New Zealand Order of Merit, for services to France–New Zealand relations.

He's also the co-chairman of the Organizing Committee of the Paris 2024 Olympic and Paralympic Games

Controversy
The 1993 French Rugby Union Championship was won by Castres who beat Grenoble 14–11 in the final, in a match decided by an irregular try accorded by the referee.

A try of Olivier Brouzet is denied to Grenoble and the decisive try by Gary Whetton was awarded by the referee, Daniel Salles, when in fact the defender Franck Hueber from Grenoble touched down the ball first in his try zone. This error gave the title to Castres.

Daniel Salles admitted the error 13 years later.

Jacques Fouroux conflict with the Federation cry out conspiracy.

References

1947 births
Living people
People from Tarbes
World Rugby Committee members
Officiers of the Légion d'honneur
Officers of the New Zealand Order of Merit
Presidents of the French Rugby Federation